Casa Real (Spanish: royal house) may refer to:
 Casa Real (Lingayen), a public building in Pangasinan, Philippines
 Casa Real de Iloilo, a government building in Iloilo City, Philippines
 Marquisate of Casa Real, a title of Spanish nobility
 Monarchy of Spain